"Do They Know It's Christmas?" is a charity song written in 1984 by Bob Geldof and Midge Ure to raise money for the 1983–1985 famine in Ethiopia. It was first recorded by Band Aid, a supergroup assembled by Geldof and Ure consisting of popular British and Irish musical acts at the time. It was recorded in a single day at Sarm West Studios in Notting Hill, London, in November 1984.

"Do They Know It's Christmas" was released in the United Kingdom on 3 December 1984. It entered the UK Singles Chart at number one and stayed there for five weeks, becoming Christmas number one. It sold a million copies in the first week, becoming the fastest-selling single in UK chart history; it held this title until 1997, when it was overtaken by Elton John's "Candle in the Wind 1997". UK sales passed three million on the last day of 1984.

The song also reached number one in thirteen other countries. In the US, it fell short of the top ten in the Billboard Hot 100 due to a lack of airplay, but sold an estimated 2.5 million copies there by January 1985. By 1989, it had sold 11.7 million copies worldwide. Geldof hoped that it would raise £70,000 for Ethiopia; within a year, it raised £8 million. The success led to several other charity singles, such as "We Are the World" (1985) by USA for Africa, and spin-off charity events, such as Comic Relief and the 1985 Live Aid concert. The original version of "Do They Know It's Christmas?" has sold 3.8 million copies in the UK. In a UK poll in December 2012, it was voted sixth on the ITV television special The Nation's Favourite Christmas Song.

"Do They Know It's Christmas?" was rerecorded and rereleased in 1989, 2004 and 2014. The 1989 and 2004 versions also raised funds for famine relief, while the 2014 version raised funds for the Ebola crisis in West Africa. All three reached number one in the UK, and the 1989 and 2004 versions became Christmas number ones. The 2004 version sold 1.8 million copies.

Background

"Do They Know It's Christmas?" was inspired by a series of reports made by the BBC journalist Michael Buerk in 1984, which drew attention to the famine in Ethiopia. The BBC News crew were the first to document the famine, with Buerk's report on 23 October describing it as "a biblical famine in the 20th century" and "the closest thing to hell on Earth". The report featured the nurse Claire Bertschinger, who had to choose which children would receive the limited amount of food at the feeding station and who were too sick to be saved. The reports shocked the UK, motivating the British people to inundate relief agencies, such as Save the Children, with donations. The Boomtown Rats singer Bob Geldof and his then-partner, the television presenter Paula Yates, watched the broadcast on 23 October and were deeply affected by it. Geldof said about Bertschinger: "In her was vested the power of life and death. She had become godlike, and that is unbearable for anyone."

On 2 November, Yates was in the Tyne Tees studio in Newcastle upon Tyne, where she was presenting the weekly live music show The Tube. Among the acts performing were Ultravox, promoting their greatest hits album The Collection. The singer, Midge Ure, was chatting to Yates in the dressing room when Geldof called her. Geldof had worked with Ure at the 1981 charity benefit show The Secret Policeman's Ball. Geldof asked to speak to Ure and told him that he wanted to do something to alleviate the suffering in Ethiopia. He and Ure arranged to discuss ideas over lunch the following Monday, 5 November, and decided to make a charity record. 

Geldof began recruiting musicians. He called Sting and Simon Le Bon, who agreed to participate along with the rest of Duran Duran, and recruited Spandau Ballet after a chance meeting with the band's guitarist Gary Kemp at an antiques shop in London. Geldof said: "It suddenly it hit me. I thought, 'Christ, we have got the real top boys here', all the big names in pop are suddenly ready and willing to do this... I knew then that we were off, and I just decided to go for all the rest of the faces and started to ring everyone up, asking them to do it." Further phone calls from Geldof also secured promises of everybody involved in the record's making to provide their services free of charge. Other contributors included UK music magazines, which donated advertising space to promote the single; Geldof's record label Phonogram, which released the single; their parent company PolyGram, which distributed it; and the artist Peter Blake, who created the single's sleeve.

Composition

Geldof and Ure's biggest challenge was to write a song that could be recorded and released in time for Christmas. They realised that they would have to write one themselves and not record a cover version; otherwise, they would have to pay royalties which would have to be subtracted from the amount raised for charity. On the Monday afternoon Ure came up with the outline of what he felt sounded a Christmas-like melody on a portable keyboard, which he recorded onto a tape and sent to Geldof, who sarcastically told him that the tune sounded like the theme to Z-Cars. Geldof came to Ure's house the next day and together they worked on the tune with Geldof on his acoustic guitar. Geldof added lyrics based on a song he had originally written for the Boomtown Rats, as he later recalled:

Ure recorded Geldof and his guitar and used the recording to develop Geldof's ideas later back in his home studio, adding his own melody onto the end as a chorus. He later stated that he had been unable to improve on Geldof's lyrics and left most of them as they were, with the exception of the line "And there won't be snow in Africa this Christmas time" – the original lyric substituted "Africa" with "Ethiopia" but Ure decided that this did not scan.

Geldof asked Trevor Horn to produce the song; Horn was an in-demand producer, having produced three number-one singles that year for Frankie Goes to Hollywood. Although Horn was receptive, he said he needed at least six weeks to produce the song, which would make it impossible to release by Christmas. However, he allowed the team to use his studios, Sarm West Studios in Notting Hill, London, free for 24 hours on 25 November. Horn would later remix and co-produce the 12" version of the single, and remix it for the 1985 re-release. In Horn's absence, Ure produced the song; he spent several days in his home studio with his engineer Rik Walton creating the backing track, programming the keyboards and drum machines. He used a sample of the drums from the title track of the 1983 Tears for Fears album The Hurting for the intro. John Taylor of Duran Duran and Paul Weller visited Ure's studio the day before the recording to add bass guitar and lead guitar; Ure and Weller later agreed that the guitar did not fit the predominantly synthesizer-based song and did not use it. Ure sang the original guide vocal, and Simon Le Bon and Sting came to Ure's studio to record their parts.

Recording
While Ure was occupied creating the song's backing track in the studio, Geldof was busy contacting various British and Irish artists to ask them to appear for the recording session. His plan was to have the biggest names in British and Irish music at the time appear on the record, and few declined: Geldof later revealed only three people had turned him down, but refused to disclose who. Those he asked but who were unable to appear instead sent recorded messages of support that appeared on the single's B-side, including David Bowie and Paul McCartney. Another UK act who had been successful in 1984, the Thompson Twins, were unable to appear on the Band Aid record as they were out of the country and were made aware of the recording too late to return and be involved in it, but they donated part of the proceeds of their then current single "Lay Your Hands on Me" to the Action for Ethiopia charity.

Geldof and Ure arrived at Sarm West Studios at around 8am on Sunday 25 November with the media in attendance outside. With recording scheduled to begin at 10:30am the artists began arriving. Geldof had arranged for the UK newspaper The Daily Mirror to have exclusive access inside the studio, and ensured that a 'team photo' was taken by the newspaper's photographer Brian Aris before any recording got under way, knowing that it would be ready in time to appear in the following day's edition of the newspaper and help publicise the record. The photograph also appeared on the back cover of the single.

Ure played the backing track and guide vocals to the artists and then decided, as a way of getting all involved straightaway, to record the climax first. The artists were put in a huge group and sang the 'Feed the world, let them know it's Christmas time' refrain over and over again until it was complete. Having recorded the group, Ure chose Tony Hadley of Spandau Ballet to be the first singer into the studio to record his solo part. Hadley admitted that this had been nerve-wracking, knowing that all his contemporaries were watching him. One by one the other assigned singers then did likewise, with Ure taping their efforts and then making notes on which segments would be cut into the final recording. Le Bon, despite having already recorded his part at Ure's house, re-recorded it so he could be part of the moment. Sting also recorded his words again, this time to provide harmony vocals. Despite being lead singers themselves, both Geldof and Ure had already decided that they would not sing any solo lines, although both took part in the 'feed the world' finale. Ure later stated in his autobiography that he was constantly battling with Geldof, and telling him to leave when he would come into the production booth and wrongly tell the artist behind the microphone what to sing.

Phil Collins arrived with his entire drum kit to record a live drum track on top of the already programmed drum machine. He set up the kit and then waited patiently until early evening until after all the vocals had been recorded. Ure was content with the first take that Collins performed, but the perfectionist Collins was unhappy with it and asked for a second take to be recorded, which he was satisfied with.

Although the majority of the artists who took part were the UK or Ireland's biggest musical stars at the time, there were a few unusual participants. Members of the US group Kool & the Gang appeared on the record because they were signed to the same record label as the Boomtown Rats, and just happened to be visiting Phonogram's London offices on the day that Geldof walked in to pitch his idea for the charity single to the label. Singer Marilyn, who had scored a couple of chart hits a year earlier but whose star had faded throughout 1984, saw the opportunity to reclaim the spotlight and turned up to the recording despite not being invited to take part, a fact overlooked by Geldof and Ure who felt any publicity was good publicity and the more stars they could get to appear on the record, the better. Actor Nigel Planer, who had reached number two earlier in the year with a cover version of "Hole in My Shoe" in the guise of his character Neil from the television comedy series The Young Ones, also showed up uninvited and in character as Neil to play up to the cameras, and after being tolerated for a while was sent away by Ure.

Geldof also asked Francis Rossi and Rick Parfitt, the two frontmen of rock band Status Quo, to take part, knowing that although the group were from an entirely different musical era and background, their consistent chart success and fame would bring a certain amount of credibility to the project from the rock fraternity and ensure that the group's loyal following of fans (the "Quo Army") would buy the record in large numbers. Ure's original idea was for Rossi and Parfitt to sing the "here's to you" harmonies in the song's bridge, but he had to shelve the idea because Parfitt could not hit the high notes. This section was eventually taken on by Weller, Sting and Glenn Gregory. Rossi privately told Ure afterwards that in the studio he sang most of Status Quo's vocal parts and that Parfitt only usually sang onstage, and that Ure should have kept Parfitt away from the microphone. Parfitt admitted in a 2004 documentary that he and Rossi had been extremely hungover from partying the night before, and were in no fit state to attempt to record their vocals. However, according to the journalist Robin Eggar, who at the time was music correspondent for The Daily Mirror and who was the only journalist present throughout the recording of the song, the pair were able to contribute in other ways: "Once Status Quo produced their bag of cocaine and the booze started to flow – I brought six bottles of wine from my flat, which disappeared in a minute – it became a party."

Geldof had been keen to include Culture Club's Boy George on the single, at the time one of the biggest music stars in the world, and had called him in New York the day before the recording to insist that George turn up. By midday, with George still absent, an irate Geldof telephoned him again demanding to know where he was. Having only gone to bed a few hours before, a sleepy George was woken up by Geldof insisting that he get onto a Concorde transatlantic flight later that morning. However, George went back to sleep following the phone call, and only made it onto the last Concorde flight of the day later that afternoon. George eventually arrived at Sarm West at 6pm and went immediately into the recording booth to deliver his lines, the last solo artist of the day. Once George's contribution had been recorded, Ure began working on the mix as the participants began to party in the studio. A B-side, titled "Feed the World", was also produced by Trevor Horn in his own studio, using the same instrumental track as the A-side and featuring messages from artists who had been at the recording, and also from those who had been unable to attend, including David Bowie, Paul McCartney, the members of Big Country and Holly Johnson from Frankie Goes to Hollywood. Before departing the Sarm Studio, Geldof recorded a statement, which featured as the last message on "Feed the World". Geldof's spoken-word statement said:

Style and content
The song comprises two parts: a verse and bridge which allow individual singers to perform different lines; and a chorus in the form of two repeated phrases by ensemble. The first line of the recording is sung by Paul Young on the 1984 version, Kylie Minogue on the 1989 version, Chris Martin of Coldplay on the 2004 version, and One Direction on the 2014 version. The opening line was sung by David Bowie at the Live Aid concert in 1985.

Release and promotion
The day after recording, Geldof appeared on Mike Read's BBC Radio 1 Breakfast Show to promote the record and promised that every penny would go to the cause. Most record retailers agreed to sell the record at its cost price of £1.35 including VAT: however, some refused, citing cost pressures. Geldof was also incensed that the British Government refused to waive the VAT on the sales of the single. He made the headlines by publicly standing up to Prime Minister Margaret Thatcher. In the end the government relented and donated an amount to the charity equal to the amount of tax they had collected on the single.

Radio 1 began to play the song every hour – normally an A-list single got seven or eight plays per day. The number one single at the time of its release was "I Should Have Known Better" by Jim Diamond, and Diamond was quoted as saying, "I'm delighted to be at number one, but next week I don't want people to buy my record; I want them to buy Band Aid instead".

The song had advance orders of 250,000 within a week of its recording, and orders from record dealers had topped one million by 8 December. In order to meet demand, Phonogram had all five of their European factories put to work pressing the single.

Initial quantities of "Do They Know It's Christmas?" were released on Monday 3 December 1984; however, it was not officially released until 7 December. It received further publicity from a launch party that day at the Royal Albert Hall during the charity event "Dinner at Albert's", an evening of music to raise money for Save the Children and the Ethiopia Famine Relief Fund. The single entered the UK Singles Chart the following week at number one, outselling all the other records in the chart put together, with the 7" single alone selling 200,000 copies in the first two days of release.

Released in the US on 10 December 1984 on Columbia Records, "Do They Know It's Christmas?" sold 1.9 million copies in its first eleven days on release but did not reach number one there, due to the more complex nature of the chart system, which counted airplay as well as sales. Despite outselling the official number one by four to one, it did not make the top ten due to a lack of airplay, ultimately peaking at number 13 on the Billboard Hot 100.

Due to the time constraints of releasing the single as quickly as possible, the promotional video for the song simply featured footage from the recording session. David Bowie, who had been Geldof's original choice to sing the song's opening line but who had been unable to attend the recording, flew into England from Switzerland to record a short introduction for the video to be played on the BBC's flagship television music show Top of the Pops. However, Geldof was unhappy when he discovered that the show's regulations meant that the song and its video could not be played until it had actually charted. Undeterred, he contacted BBC1 controller Michael Grade directly and persuaded Grade to order that every programme preceding that week's episode of Top of the Pops should start five minutes early to make space to broadcast the song's video (complete with Bowie's introduction) just before the show.

Each week of its stay at number one, the video was shown on Top of the Pops. However, for the Christmas Day special edition of the programme, most of the artists on the record appeared in the studio to mime to the song as it was relayed through the speaker system. The two most notable absentees were George Michael and Bono: during Michael's line the cameras focused on the studio audience, while Paul Weller mimed Bono's line to the camera.

The charity received a further boost during Band Aid's five week tenure at the top of the UK charts with Wham! at number two with their double A-side "Last Christmas"/"Everything She Wants". Wham! singer George Michael had appeared on the Band Aid single and he and fellow band member Andrew Ridgeley donated all the royalties from their single to the Band Aid Trust. As of 2021, "Last Christmas" has sold almost two million copies, and until it reached number one in January 2021 it held the record for the biggest-selling single never to reach number one in the UK.

A 30-minute video titled 'Do They Know It's Christmas?' – The Story of the Official Band Aid Video was released in the UK on 15 December 1984 and in the US on 18 December 1984 on VHS and Betamax formats. The video featured documentary footage shot at the recording session and interviews with Geldof and Ure, as well as the completed promotional video. At the 1986 Grammy Awards the song's video was nominated for the Best Music Video, Short Form award, eventually losing out to its US counterpart song "We Are the World".

Reception
The reception in December 1984 to the original single from the UK music press was mixed. Under a caption of "TURKEY" (a double meaning referring both to the traditional Christmas dinner and an artistic failure), the biggest selling music paper NME dismissed the song with the single line, "Millions of Dead Stars write and perform rotten record for the right reasons". The other two major music papers looked upon the record more favourably, recognising that while musically the song was flawed, its intentions were admirable. Sounds said, "It's far from brilliant (if not quite the Bland Aid some have predicted) but you can have fun playing Spot the Star on the vocals, and it deserves to sell by the truckload". Melody Maker stated, "Inevitably, after such massive publicity, the record itself is something of an anti-climax, even though Geldof's sense of universal melodrama is perfectly suited to this kind of epic musical manifesto. Midge Ure's large-screen production and the emotional vocal deliveries of the various celebrities matches the demonstrative sweep of Geldof's lyric, which veers occasionally toward an uncomfortably generalised sentimentality which threatens to turn righteous pleading into pompous indignation. On the other hand, I'm sure it's impossible to write flippantly about something as fundamentally dreadful as the Ethiopia famine."

In retrospective reviews, the song has received criticism for what has been described as a colonial western-centric viewpoint and condescending stereotypical descriptions of Africa, including the phrase sung by Bono: Well tonight thank God it's them instead of you. For the 2014 version, several lyrics that were previously criticised were rewritten, and the song was changed to focus on Ebola rather than the original version's famine. The new lyrics have also been criticised as promoting stereotypes and condescension. However, criticism from Africans regarding the song remained: in 2014, African activists and Twitter users complained that the song disregarded the diversity of the continent of Africa and ultimately did more harm than good for the people. Musician Fuse ODG turned down a request to sing on the 2014 version, stating that the lyrics of the song do not reflect what Africa truly is. He cited lyrics such as "There is no peace and joy in west (sic) Africa this Christmas"; saying he goes to Ghana yearly for the sole purpose of peace and joy, so singing such lyrics would be a blatant lie.

In 2010, Geldof told Australia's Daily Telegraph "I am responsible for two of the worst songs in history. The other one is 'We Are the World'." Ure's assessment in his autobiography was that "it is a song that has nothing to do with music. It was all about generating money... The song didn't matter: the song was secondary, almost irrelevant."

In 2005, a parody version entitled "Do They Know It's Hallowe'en?" was created to poke fun at the lyrics in the original version.

1985 reissue
"Do They Know It's Christmas?" was reissued the following year on 29 November 1985, reaching number three in the UK Singles Chart the week following Christmas. The 1985 single was remixed by Trevor Horn, the intended producer of the original version, and it included an updated B-side entitled "One Year On (Feed the World)", beginning and ending with a recording of a telephone message from Geldof and in between featuring Ure reciting a list of what had been bought with the money raised during the previous 12 months.

Personnel
(adapted from credits on back cover of the record sleeve)

Vocalists
Robert "Kool" Bell (Kool & the Gang)
Bono (U2)
Pete Briquette (The Boomtown Rats)
Adam Clayton (U2)
Phil Collins (Genesis and solo artist)
Chris Cross (Ultravox)
Simon Crowe (The Boomtown Rats)
Sara Dallin (Bananarama)
Siobhan Fahey (Bananarama)
Johnny Fingers (The Boomtown Rats)
Bob Geldof (The Boomtown Rats)
Boy George (Culture Club)
Glenn Gregory (Heaven 17)
Tony Hadley (Spandau Ballet)
John Keeble (Spandau Ballet)
Gary Kemp (Spandau Ballet)
Martin Kemp (Spandau Ballet)
Simon Le Bon (Duran Duran)
Marilyn
George Michael (Wham!)
Jon Moss (Culture Club)
Steve Norman (Spandau Ballet)
Rick Parfitt (Status Quo)

Nick Rhodes (Duran Duran)
Francis Rossi (Status Quo)
Sting (The Police)
Andy Taylor (Duran Duran)
James "J.T." Taylor (Kool & the Gang)
John Taylor (Duran Duran)
Roger Taylor (Duran Duran)
Dennis Thomas (Kool & the Gang)
Midge Ure (Ultravox)
Martyn Ware (Heaven 17)
Jody Watley
Paul Weller (The Style Council)
Keren Woodward (Bananarama)
Paul Young

Additional spoken messages on B-side
Stuart Adamson, Mark Brzezicki, Tony Butler, Bruce Watson (Big Country)
David Bowie
Holly Johnson (Frankie Goes to Hollywood)
Paul McCartney

Musicians
Phil Collins – drums
John Taylor – bass
Midge Ure – keyboards and programming

Notes

Charts

Weekly charts

Year-end charts

Certifications and sales

Band Aid II

A second version of "Do They Know It's Christmas?" was recorded under the name of Band Aid II in 1989, overseen by the most successful British production team of the late 1980s, Stock Aitken Waterman. Geldof had telephoned Pete Waterman to ask him to produce a new version of the song to aid the ongoing situation in Ethiopia, and within 24 hours the recording session had been arranged at Stock Aitken Waterman's studios on London's South Bank. The recording took place over the weekend of 2 and 3 December, and featured several artists who had already been produced by SAW, including Kylie Minogue, Jason Donovan, Bananarama, Sonia, and Cliff Richard, as well as other artists who had big hits in 1989, such as Lisa Stansfield, Jimmy Somerville, Wet Wet Wet and Bros. Bananarama's Sara Dallin and Keren Woodward became the only artists to appear on both the 1984 and 1989 versions of the record. Siobhan Fahey, who had been part of Bananarama's line-up at the time the first recording of the song was released, had left the group in 1988.

The lyrics were rearranged for a more traditional 'verse and chorus' structure, with the opening verse being split in two with a short repeat of the ending chorus being played at the end of both, followed by the "here's to you" section and a final lengthened version of the closing chorus (with commentary by Michael Buerk played over the outro in the music video).

Released on 11 December 1989, the Band Aid II version spent three weeks at number one in the UK, becoming the Christmas number one single and the last number one single of the 1980s, and ended the year as the ninth biggest selling single of 1989.

Personnel
(adapted from credits on back cover of the record sleeve)
Bananarama
Big Fun
Bros
Cathy Dennis
D Mob
Jason Donovan
Kevin Godley
Glen Goldsmith
Kylie Minogue
The Pasadenas
Chris Rea
Cliff Richard
Jimmy Somerville
Sonia
Lisa Stansfield
Technotronic (incorrectly listed as "Technotronics" on the record sleeve)
Wet Wet Wet

Musicians

Matt Aitken – keyboards, guitar
Luke Goss – drums
Chris Rea – guitar
Mike Stock – keyboards
The sleeve also credits "A Linn" with playing drums on the record, a joking reference to the programmed Linn drum machine.

Charts and certifications

Weekly charts

Year-end charts

Certifications

Band Aid 20

Band Aid 20 recorded a third version of the song in November 2004 for the twentieth anniversary of the original recording, and again got to number one. The recording and release of the single tied in with the release of the Live Aid concert on DVD for the first time. The idea was prompted by Coldplay's Chris Martin, although Geldof and Ure both got quickly involved. Geldof did the publicity and educated the younger artists on the issues (some of whom had not been born, or were very young, when the original was recorded) while Ure filmed the event for the corresponding documentary.

The song was produced by Nigel Godrich, who was contacted by Ure. Godrich said: "'I thought, 'Oh fuck!' Then I thought I should do it. In our lives we give so little back." He enlisted musicians including Paul McCartney (on bass), the Supergrass drummer Danny Goffey, and Thom Yorke and Jonny Greenwood from Radiohead. He said in 2009: "I'm glad I did it – it raised quite a bit of money. It came on when I was sitting in a lobby somewhere once, and it took me a while to recognise it. It sounded good though, better than I remembered."

The gathering of the artists to record the song's chorus took place at AIR Studios in Hampstead in north London on Sunday 14 November 2004, although the backing track and many of the solo lines had been recorded over the previous two days. Damon Albarn did not take part in the recording but turned up to serve tea to the participants.

This version of the song featured an extra segment—a rap by Dizzee Rascal in the midst of the "here's to you" section. Bono flew in especially from Ireland late on Sunday evening to sing the same line as he had done two decades earlier, making him the sixth artist to appear on two versions, in addition to Geldof, Ure, McCartney, Sara Dallin and Keren Woodward (Bananarama).

Personnel

Vocalists
 Tim Wheeler (Ash)
 Daniel Bedingfield
 Natasha Bedingfield
 Bono (U2)
 Busted
 Chris Martin (Coldplay)
 Dido – performed separately from a studio in Melbourne
 Dizzee Rascal – the only artist to add lyrics to the song
 Ms Dynamite
 Skye Edwards (Morcheeba)
 Estelle
 Feeder
 Neil Hannon (The Divine Comedy)
 Justin Hawkins (The Darkness)
 Jamelia
 Tom Chaplin (Keane)
 Tim Rice-Oxley (Keane)
 Beverley Knight
 Lemar
 Shaznay Lewis (All Saints)
 Katie Melua
 Róisín Murphy (Moloko)

 Snow Patrol
 Rachel Stevens
 Joss Stone
 Sugababes
 The Thrills
 Turin Brakes
 Robbie Williams – performed separately from a studio in Los Angeles
 Will Young
 Fran Healy (Travis)

Musicians
 Danny Goffey (Supergrass) – drums
 Jonny Greenwood (Radiohead) – guitar
 Dan Hawkins (The Darkness) – guitar
 Justin Hawkins (The Darkness) – guitar
 Paul McCartney – bass guitar
 Thom Yorke (Radiohead) – piano

Additional personnel
 Damon Albarn – tea boy
 Bob Geldof – organiser
 Nigel Godrich – producer
 Midge Ure – executive producer

Charts and certifications

Weekly charts

Year-end charts

Certifications

Band Aid 30

At a press conference on 10 November 2014, Geldof and Ure announced that another group of artists would come together to re-record the song, this time under the banner of Band Aid 30 and in aid of the Ebola crisis. The 2014 version was recorded on Saturday 15 November 2014 and released on the following Monday, 17 November.

Background
Tracey Emin provided the artwork and Paul Epworth produced the track. Vocal contributions came from artists including Ed Sheeran, One Direction, Paloma Faith, Ellie Goulding, Seal, Sam Smith, Sinéad O'Connor, Rita Ora, Emeli Sandé, Bastille and Olly Murs. Returning guest musicians from previous versions of the song included Chris Martin (who recorded the opening lines of the 2004 version) and Bono (who sang the tenth line in both the 1984 and 2004 versions). Unlike the previous versions, where lyrics were almost identical to the original, the lyrics were altered to address the then-ongoing outbreak. The lyric changes include:

 "Where the only water flowing is the bitter sting of tears" is replaced with "Where a kiss of love can kill you and there's death in every tear"
 "Well, tonight thank God it's them instead of you" is replaced with "Well tonight we're reaching out and touching you"
 "And there won't be snow in Africa this Christmas time" is replaced with "Bring peace and joy this Christmas to West Africa".
 "The greatest gift they'll get this year is life" is replaced with "A song of hope where there's no hope tonight".
 "Where nothing ever grows, no rain or rivers flow" is replaced with "Why is comfort to be feared? Why is to touch to be scared?".
 "Underneath that burning sun" is replaced with "And all there is to come".
 "Do they know..." is rephrased as "How can they know...".
 During the coda, "Feed the world" alternates with "Heal the world".

Personnel

Vocalists:
Bastille
Bono (U2)
Alfie Deyes
Paloma Faith
Guy Garvey (Elbow)
Ellie Goulding
Angélique Kidjo
Chris Martin (Coldplay)
Sinéad O'Connor
One Direction
Rita Ora
Olly Murs

Emeli Sandé
Seal
Ed Sheeran
Sam Smith
Joe Sugg
Zoe Sugg
Karl Hyde (Underworld)
Jessie Ware

Musicians:
Milan Neil Amin-Smith (Clean Bandit) – violin
Grace Chatto (Clean Bandit) – cello
Roger Taylor (Queen) – drums, keyboards

Additional personnel:
Paul Epworth – producer

German version
A German-language version of "Do They Know It's Christmas?" was released on 21 November 2014. It was produced by Vincent Sorg and Tobias Kuhn and features vocals from artists including 2raumwohnung, Andreas Bourani, Die Toten Hosen, Jan Delay, Joy Denalane, Max Raabe, Milky Chance, Peter Maffay, Silbermond, Thees Uhlmann, and Wolfgang Niedecken.

Track listing

Charts and certifications

Weekly charts
British and Irish version (original)

German version

Year-end charts

Certifications

Release history

Glee Cast version

The song was covered by the cast of Glee and was released in 2011 as a single and alongside the full-length album Glee: The Music, The Christmas Album Volume 2. The song was featured in the season three Christmas episode, "Extraordinary Merry Christmas".

Charts

Band Aid Liverpool version
In December 2020, a group of musicians from Liverpool recorded a version of "Do They Know It's Christmas" under the name Band Aid Liverpool as a charity record in support of Shelter. Retitled "Do They Know It's Christmas (Feed the World)" with lyrics referring to places on Merseyside, the project was given the go-ahead by Bob Geldof and Midge Ure, with Band Aid Liverpool releasing their cover version on 10 December 2020.

Keith Lemon and Friends version
In December 2020, comedian Leigh Francis recorded a version of the song in honour of late TV presenter Caroline Flack, with proceeds raising money for the Trussell Trust, Crisis, UNICEF, Shelter and Samaritans. His version, recorded in character as Keith Lemon and the Bear from Bo' Selecta!, featured Emma Bunton, Peter Andre and Ronan Keating (with Keating also turning up on a version of LadBaby's "Don't Stop Me Eatin'", another 2020 Christmas number one contender raising money for the Trussell Trust).

LadBaby version

On 12 December 2022, British blogger Mark Hoyle, aka LadBaby, announced that he had been given permission from Ure, Geldof, and the Band Aid trust to rewrite the lyrics to "Do They Know It's Christmas?" and release it as his 2022 Christmas single. Retitled "Food Aid", the single was released on 16 December 2022, and featured Hoyle's wife Roxanne and Martin Lewis. Half of the money raised would go to the Trussell Trust and the other half to the Band Aid Trust.

On 23 December 2022, it was announced that LadBaby was the Christmas number one for the fifth consecutive year, making them the first act to achieve five UK Christmas number-one singles, surpassing the record set by the Beatles who had four in 1963, 1964, 1965 and 1967.

Charts

See also
 "Starvation/Tam Tam Pour L'Ethiopie", a 1985 charity single featuring British and African artists
 "Tears Are Not Enough", a 1985 charity single recorded by Northern Lights, a supergroup of Canadian artists

References

1984 songs
1984 debut singles
1985 singles
1989 singles
2004 singles
2014 singles
Aid songs for Africa
Albums with cover art by Peter Blake (artist)
All-star recordings
British Christmas songs
Christmas charity singles
Christmas number-one singles in the United Kingdom
Columbia Records singles
European Hot 100 Singles number-one singles
Irish Singles Chart number-one singles
Island Records singles
Mercury Records singles
Music videos directed by Nigel Dick
Number-one singles in Australia
Number-one singles in Austria
Number-one singles in Denmark
Number-one singles in Finland
Number-one singles in Germany
Number-one singles in Hungary
Number-one singles in New Zealand
Number-one singles in Norway
Number-one singles in Scotland
Number-one singles in Spain
Number-one singles in Sweden
Number-one singles in Switzerland
Pete Waterman Entertainment singles
Phonogram Records singles
Polydor Records singles
RPM Top Singles number-one singles
Slade songs
SNEP Top Singles number-one singles
Songs about poverty
Songs written by Midge Ure
UK Singles Chart number-one singles
Virgin EMI Records singles